Frontpage is the title of a Malaysian television drama created by Kabir Bhatia and Mira Mustaffa, which tells the adventures of the journalists of a fictional newspaper publisher, inspired by events which grabbed the headlines in Malaysian papers throughout history. Frontpage is jointly produced by The Star newspaper, broadcaster ntv7 and Filmscape, a production house owned by Juita Viden.

Overview
Frontpage tells of the main characters as the staff of Malaysia's top newspaper The Voice, consisting of Andrea Ng (Bernie Chan) the news desk editor and all the journalists under her supervision, which consist of seasoned rivals Jack Lee (Tony Eusoff) and Dylan Pereira (Jehan Miskin), joined by newcomer Nerina Rahman (Cheryl Samad). All of them as part of a newspaper tackle a capricious profession for the sake of scooping the best for their readers. Each episode is actually adapted from real headline-grabbers from local dailies throughout the past quarter-century.

Characters

Main characters
Jack Lee, Senior Journalist, Newsdesk (played by Tony Eusoff):Aloof and rebellious, Jack prefers to do things on his own and in his own way. He does not play by the rules and hates authority figures. He takes his job seriously and will not stop at anything to bring the truth to the people. But at the same time Jack has an emotional distance to his stories. He learned how to do that, the hard way.When Jack was a rookie reporter, he made a promise to a whistleblower of a corporate giant, to print his story. But Jack was shut down by his editor for lack of evidence (or supposed fear of retaliation by the corporation). The whistleblower committed suicide. Jack felt responsible and it took a long time before he could forget (but not forgive himself). Jack was offered to post of editor a few years back, but he refused. He is not a desk person, and he will never leave the street. Andrea accepted the position.
Andrea Ng, Editor, Newsdesk (Bernie Chan):Andrea knows as a woman handling the news desk of the country's biggest newspaper, she is always in the firing line -from the public, from the bosses, and from the journalists. There's always someone, somewhere who is displeased with her. She develops a tough exterior, but we see a more vulnerable side of her outside of work.Andrea and Jack dated when she first joined the newspaper, but Jack's too much of a loner to ever really commit to anyone. Andrea is now dating Dylan, but in the back of her mind, she's always wondered if Dylan is with her for herself, or is it some twisted way of up one ship in his rivalry with Jack.Andrea was killed off in episode 9, by having shot from behind by what happened to be a victim of a loan shark whose advertisement was published in the Voice.
Dylan Pereira, Journalist, Newsdesk (Jehan Miskin):Dylan has climbed the proverbial ladder one step at a time. Although he is passionate about his work, Dylan believes in playing by the book  - no gray areas, no crossing the lines. It annoys him to see Jack getting away with some of the things he does. And how Andrea lets him. Apparently the same rules do not apply to Jack as to everyone else.Dylan is also less than happy with Jack and Andrea's past relationship. He suspects she still has feelings for Jack, although she denies it.
Nerina Rahman, Rookie Journalist (Cheryl Samad):Nerina had wanted to be journalist since she was in primary school, when her exposé on "ulat in the nasi lemak" in the school paper caused the school to change canteen operator and the other kids to think of her as a hero. She joins the newspaper in spite of her wealthy father's protests, fully intending to bring down the bad guys and rescuing the innocent. But Nerina is about to discover that the bad guys are sometimes the good guys.Nerina has a huge crush on Jack, but he is intent on pushing her away. Nerina is unaware of Jack and Andrea's past, and wonders why Andrea is very sharp to her sometimes and overly protective at others.
Lulu Chia, Senior Journalist, Lifestyle (Nell Ng):Lulu has a sharp tongue, and a sharper pen. Her stories have embarrassed actresses, designers, record companies. She is someone everyone in the entertainment industry loves to hate. Lulu is not bothered when people chide her for being not at all disconcerted by what they think of her. After all she's not making up the stories, she's just reporting them. Her view is: "if you don't want it in the papers, don't do it."Growing up, Lulu constantly struggled with issues of self-esteem. She was always big for her age, and her "unique" tastes in clothes became the butt of jokes. Lulu sees her position in the newspaper as divine retribution. It's her job to bring down all those beautiful people who made life miserable for people like her, people who are different.
Rebecca Anuar, Senior Journalist  (Nurakhtar Amin):Rebecca says what's on her mind, always. She appears cold, and arrogant, but her tough exterior hides a troubled past. At a young age, her father, an Englishman, abandoned her mother. Her mother married another man, but he maltreated her sexually during her early adolescence. She also attempted to flee from her home and commit suicide. At 15, Rebecaa went to boarding school despite her stepfather's objections.In boarding school, Rebecca excelled in her studies, and every other girl hated her for her antisocial behaviour. Her interest in journalism stemmed from the need to expose the truth. Once she left home, she never went back, cutting all ties with her mother and stepfather. After university, she joined the Tribune, and quickly became a top notch reporter. She has never had a relationship with any man. She left the Tribune, for The Voice because one of her colleagues "wanted to know her better (romantically)". Rebecca crumbles at the prospect of anyone getting to know her. Despite her façade of confidence, she always feels that she is spoiled and not worthy to be loved; or to love.

Supporting characters
"Chief" (Priyadev Aravind):Ketua Penyunting The Voice. Priyadev himself is a sub-editor for the Star. Without a known name, the character is only known "Chief"; he was originally designated the name "Mr. Tan".
Melvin D'Cruz: Sub-editor of The Voice.
Lorna Liu:Marketing director of The Voice.

Episode list

References

External links
Frontpage official website
Frontpage episodes on ntv7's Catch-Up TV

Malaysian drama television series